Female submission or femsub is an activity or relationship in which a woman consents to submit to the direction of a sexual partner or allows her body to be used sexually by or for the sexual pleasure of her partner. The expression is often associated with BDSM, when the woman voluntarily and consensually submits to such activity. Submission usually involves a degree of trust by the woman in her partner. The dominant partner is usually a man, but can also be another woman, or there can be multiple dominant partners simultaneously. The submissive woman may derive sexual pleasure or emotional gratification from relinquishing (to varying degrees) control to (as well as satisfying) a trusted dominant partner.

A 1985 study suggested that about 30% of participants in BDSM activities were females. A 2015 study indicates that 61.7% of females who are active in BDSM expressed a preference for a submissive role, 25.7% consider themselves a switch, while 12.6% prefer the dominant role. In contrast, 46.6% of men prefer the submissive role, 24% consider themselves to be switches and 29.5% prefer the dominant role.

Eroticism

Submission can take the form of passivity or obedience in relation to any aspect of conduct and behavior. Submission can be to a partner in an interpersonal relationship, such as allowing the sex partner to initiate all sexual activity as well as setting the time and place and sex position. It can also be in relation to the type of sexual activity that the partners will engage in, including non-coital sex such as anal sex, or BDSM or sexual roleplay. Some sex acts require a woman to be passive while an active sex partner performs sex acts on her, and this may be seen as a form of submission. Obedience may be a part of a sexual roleplay or activity, and can also be in the relation to the style of dress, if any, or behavior or any other manner. In fact, any act that is performed on a passive woman, such as undressing her, may be regarded as submissive behavior on the part of the woman.

Submission may be manifested in a multitude of ways whereby a woman relinquishes sexual or personal control to another, such as acts of servitude, submission to humiliation or punishment such as erotic spanking, or other activities, at times in association with bondage. Female submission can take the form of engaging in sexual activity with a person other than her normal partner, as in the case of swinging (sometimes called wife swapping or wife lending), non-monogamy or prostitution. The level and type of submission can vary from person to person, and from one time to another. Some women choose to include occasional sexual submission in an otherwise conventional sex life. For example, a woman may adopt a submissive role during a sexual activity to overcome a sexual inhibition she may have. A woman may choose to submit full-time, becoming a lifestyle slave.

Some people derive erotic pleasure from the submissiveness of a sex partner, which they may regard as a turn-on; and some people regard obvious passivity as a form of feminine flirting or seduction. Some women submit to the sexual wishes of their partner for the pleasure of the partner, which may itself result in sexual pleasure for the submissive woman.

In literature
Female submission and conquest are very common themes in traditional literature. Often this reflected the reality of a woman's position in marriage and her defenceless and subordinate position in society in general.

Story of O, published in 1954 in French, is an erotic tale of female submission involving a beautiful Parisian fashion photographer named O, who is taught to be constantly available for all forms of sex, offering herself to any male.

Wonder Woman's original key weakness was permitting herself to be bound by a man. While this exploitable weakness has since been retconned out of continuity by DC comics, it was absolutely key to the character Dr. Marston, an ardent feminist and practicing psychologist, was creating. His point was that women are not actually inferior to men, they are oppressed. The only reason they are "weaker" is because they allow men to make them so.

See also
Breast torture
Cuckquean
Dominance and submission
Dominatrix
Fifty Shades of Grey
Gorean subculture
Male dominance
Male submission
Nyotaimori
Pussy torture
Top, bottom, switch

References

Further reading

Submissive Women - Tales of Female Submission by Monique Lassen. ASIN: B006WBRN9C.
Henryson, Dean (2014). ″Girl Fighting Exposed.″ Createspace. .

BDSM terminology
Women in society